The Drohobych Regional Committee of the Communist Party of Ukraine, commonly referred to as the Drohobych CPU obkom, was the position of highest authority in the Drohobych Oblast, in the Ukrainian SSR of the Soviet Union. The position was created on November 1939 following the 1939 Soviet invasion of Poland during the ongoing World War II and abolished in 21 May 1959. On 21 May 1959 the Drohobych Regional Committee was merged into the Lviv Regional Committee.

The First Secretary was a de facto appointed position usually by the Central Committee of the Communist Party of Ukraine or the First Secretary of the Republic.

List of First Secretaries of the Communist Party of Drohobych

See also
Drohobych Oblast

Notes

Sources
 World Statesmen.org

Regional Committees of the Communist Party of Ukraine (Soviet Union)
Ukrainian Soviet Socialist Republic
History of Lviv Oblast
1939 establishments in the Soviet Union
1959 disestablishments in the Soviet Union